Conor Branson (born 14 November 1991) is an English footballer who plays as a defender for Alfreton Town.

He has also spent time coaching and holds a UEFA B Licence qualification.

Playing career

Youth and college
Branson was a first-year scholar at Barnsley F.C. in 2009. After captaining the academy in 2009, he was promoted to the first team in 2010 on a 1-year contract. About Branson, Barnsley manager Nick Daws said, "Conor has done really well as the captain of the academy. He is a leader, a talker and an organizer. He needs to work on his game like everyone does but he is a real prospect." During the 2010/11 Championship season, he was on the bench for three first team matches but did not make an appearance. He was released by Barnsley, along with four other players, in November 2011. Upon his release from Barnsley he played for, and captained, the Nike Football Academy team in 2011/12. Following that season, he moved to the United States to play college soccer for the Golden Eagles of the University of Charleston. Over his three seasons with the team, he tallied 18 goals in 64 appearances. In 2014 and 2015 he was named Defensive Player of the Year for the Mountain East Conference and led the Golden Eagles to the NCAA national semifinals in his last season. In 2015 and 2015 he also helped lead the team to league titles while being named an Academic All-American those seasons.

Professional
Branson played for Guiseley of the National League North, the sixth tear of English football, during the 2011/12 season. He stayed with the club until September 2012 when he began attending the University of Charleston. In total he made eight appearances for the club. After college, Branson had trials with DC United and Columbus Crew, both of Major League Soccer.

In March 2016 it was announced that Branson had signed for the Pittsburgh Riverhounds of the United Soccer League a few days before the opening match of the 2016 USL season. He made his debut for the club on 2 April in the team's opening match to the Rochester Rhinos, coming on as a 68th-minute substitute for Michael Green. It was announced that Branson and the club mutually parted ways in August 2016 after making 14 appearances and scoring one goal for the club.

In the summer of 2018, he returned to the UK and joined National League North side Bradford Park Avenue. Branson finished his first season with the club with twelve goals and was named as the club's Manager's Player of the Year. On 19 June 2019, Branson left Bradford to join Altrincham.

Coaching career
Branson left Pittsburgh return to the University of Charleston as an assistant coach. He then had a spell coaching at Marshall University for the 2017 season.

Career statistics

References

External links

1991 births
Living people
English footballers
English expatriate footballers
Pittsburgh Riverhounds SC players
Expatriate soccer players in the United States
USL Championship players
Barnsley F.C. players
Guiseley A.F.C. players
Nike Academy players
Association football defenders
English expatriate sportspeople in the United States
Bradford (Park Avenue) A.F.C. players
Altrincham F.C. players
Alfreton Town F.C. players
Charleston Golden Eagles men's soccer coaches
Charleston Golden Eagles men's soccer players
Marshall Thundering Herd men's soccer coaches